The Apple Game is a 1977 Czechoslovak comedy film directed by Věra Chytilová.

Cast 
 Dagmar Bláhová - Anna Símová
 Jiří Menzel - MUDr. Josef John
 Jiří Kodet - MUDr. Arnost Rýdl
  - Marta Rýdlová
  - John's mother
 Bohuš Záhorský - Professor

References

External links 

1977 comedy films
1977 films
Czech comedy films
Films directed by Věra Chytilová
1970s Czech-language films
1970s Czech films